Dmitri Nikolayevich Telegin (born 2 February 1992) is a Russian former footballer who played as a defender.

Club career
He made his professional debut in the Russian Football National League for Yenisey Krasnoyarsk on 6 July 2014 in a game against Sokol Saratov.

References

External links
 Career summary by sportbox.ru
 
 Dmitri Telegin at FootballFacts.ru 

1992 births
Living people
Russian footballers
Footballers from Saint Petersburg
Russian expatriate footballers
Russian expatriate sportspeople in Moldova
Expatriate footballers in Moldova
Moldovan Super Liga players
FC Yenisey Krasnoyarsk players
FC Zimbru Chișinău players
Association football defenders
FC Zenit Saint Petersburg players
FC Tom Tomsk players
FC Novokuznetsk players